Spring Bluff is an unincorporated community in southwest Franklin County, Missouri, United States.

The community sits on a ridge at the intersection of Missouri routes 185 and AC approximately seven miles northwest of Sullivan. An incised meander of the Bourbeuse River lies one mile northwest of the community.

History
A post office called Springbluff was established in 1872, and remained in operation until 1933. The community most likely was so named on account of its lofty elevation above a spring.

Education 
Spring Bluff R-XV School District is a public school district that includes kindergarten through eighth grades. It received the "Distinction in Performance" award from 2001-2002 to 2011–2012.

Notes

Unincorporated communities in Franklin County, Missouri
Unincorporated communities in Missouri